Maxim Gordeev is a Kyrgyzstani Alpine Skier. He is competing in the Men's slalom at the 2022 Winter Olympics. He was the flag holder of Kyrgyzstan in the 2022 Winter Olympics opening ceremony

References

External links
 

1995 births
Living people
Kyrgyzstani male alpine skiers
Olympic alpine skiers of Kyrgyzstan
Alpine skiers at the 2022 Winter Olympics
20th-century Kyrgyzstani people
21st-century Kyrgyzstani people
Alpine skiers at the 2017 Asian Winter Games